The Blue Line is a demarcation line between Lebanon and Israel and Lebanon and the Golan Heights published by the United Nations on 7 June 2000 for the purposes of determining whether Israel had fully withdrawn from Lebanon. It has been described as: "temporary" and "not a border, but a “line of withdrawal”.

On 19 March 1978, the United Nations Security Council adopted Resolutions 425 and 426 calling for Israeli withdrawal from Lebanon following its recent invasion and to ensure that the government of Lebanon restores effective authority in the area to the border. The United Nations Security Council and NATO set up the United Nations Interim Force in Lebanon (UNIFIL) as a peacekeeping force to supervise the situation in Southern Lebanon.

By September 2018 Israel completed 11 kilometers of a concrete Israel-Lebanon barrier on the Israeli side of the demarcation line to protect Israeli communities from infiltration by Hezbollah militants. The length of the barrier is to be  and was expected to be complete by 2020. The project was expected to cost $450 million. Most of the barrier is a concrete wall topped by steel mesh, sensors and surveillance cameras. Steel fencing was to be used instead of concrete in especially rugged areas.

The Blue Line 

On 11 March 1978 Palestine Liberation Organization (PLO) operatives, led by Dalal Mugrabi, carried out the Coastal Road massacre within Israel which resulted in the deaths of 37 Israelis, including 13 children, and 76 wounded. In response, Israeli forces invaded southern Lebanon from which the PLO operated regularly during the 1970s. Starting on the night of March 14–15 and culminating a few days later, Israel Defense Forces (IDF) troops occupied the entire southern part of the country except for the city of Tyre and its surrounding area. This operation is known in Israel as Operation Litani, the stated objective of which was to clear out PLO bases in Lebanon south of the Litani River, in order to better secure northern Israel and to support the Christian Lebanese militias in the course of the Lebanese Civil War - most notably the Free Lebanon Army. On 15 March 1978 the Lebanese government submitted a strong protest to the United Nations Security Council against the Israeli invasion, stating that it had no connection with the Palestinian operation. 

On 19 March 1978 the Council adopted Resolution 425, in which it called upon Israel to cease immediately its military action and withdraw its forces from all Lebanese territory. It also established the United Nations Interim Force in Lebanon (UNIFIL). The first UNIFIL troops arrived in the area on 23 March 1978.

The Blue Line is based on the deployment of the IDF prior to 14 March 1978. It should not be confused with the Green Line, established in 1949, which is the armistice line of the 1948 Arab–Israeli War, nor the Green Line in Beirut during the violence of the 1980s. The 1949 line is in turn the same as the 1923 Mandate Line which was the border between French- and British-mandated territory (see: Paulet–Newcombe Agreement); Lebanon is a former French mandate and Palestine / Israel a former British mandate. (See League of Nations). The 1949 agreement stated that the border would follow the 1923 line. In 1923, 38 boundary markers were placed along the 49 mile border and a detailed text description was published. The 2000 Blue Line differs in about a half dozen short stretches from the 1949 line, though never by more than 475 meters.

Borders are usually negotiated between countries, and between 1950 and 1967 Israeli and Lebanese surveyors managed to complete 25 non-contiguous kilometers and mark (but not sign) another quarter of the international border. On 17 April 2000, when Israeli Prime Minister Ehud Barak announced that Israel would begin withdrawing its forces from Lebanon, the Lebanese government did not want to take part in marking the border. The UN thus conducted its own survey based on the line discussed in United Nations Security Council Resolution 425.

On 25 May 2000 the government of Israel notified the Secretary-General that Israel had redeployed its forces in compliance with Security Council resolutions 425.

From 24 May to 7 June 2000, the Special Envoy traveled to Israel and Lebanon to follow up on the implementation of the Secretary-General's May 22 report. The United Nations cartographer and his team, assisted by UNIFIL, worked on the ground to identify a line to be adopted for the practical purposes of confirming the Israeli withdrawal. While it was agreed that this would not be a formal border demarcation, the aim was to identify a line on the ground closely conforming to the internationally recognized boundaries of Lebanon, based on the best available cartographic and other documentary evidence.

On 7 June the completed map showing the withdrawal line was formally transmitted by the Force Commander of UNIFIL to his Lebanese and Israeli counterparts. Notwithstanding their reservations about the line, the Governments of Israel and Lebanon confirmed that identifying this line was solely the responsibility of the United Nations and that they would respect the line as identified. On 8 June UNIFIL teams led by Lebanese Brig. General Imad Anka and Brigadier General Amin Htait commenced the work of verifying the Israeli withdrawal behind the line.

On 16 June the Secretary-General reported to the Security Council that Israel had withdrawn its forces from Lebanon in accordance with resolution 425 (1978) and met the requirements defined in his report of 22 May 2000; namely, Israel had completed the withdrawal in conformity with the line identified by the United Nations, South Lebanese Army militia had been dismantled, and all detainees held at Al-Khiam prison had been freed.

The withdrawal line has been termed the Blue Line in all official UN communications since.

Violations of the Blue line

Israeli occupation of northern Ghajar
The ongoing Israeli occupation of northern Ghajar is a violation of the Blue line.

2000 Hezbollah cross-border raid

On 7 October 2000 three Israeli soldiers were abducted by Hezbollah forces while they were patrolling the southern (Israeli) side of the demarcation line. The soldiers were killed either during the attack or shortly after.

2006 Hezbollah cross-border raid

The 2006 Lebanon War, which lasted 34 days, was the Israeli response to Hezbollah rockets fired at Israeli border towns, which was a diversion for an anti-tank missile attack on two armored Humvees patrolling the Israeli side of the border fence. Of the seven Israeli soldiers in the two jeeps, two were wounded, five were killed, and two soldiers were taken to Lebanon. Israel responded with massive airstrikes and artillery fire on targets in Lebanon and a ground invasion of southern Lebanon.

Israeli violations of Lebanon's airspace

Following 2000 withdrawal, Lebanon's military authorities report Israeli jets have violated the UN resolution 1701 by entering the country's airspace and breaking sound barriers over several villages in southern parts of the nation. Lebanese troops have responded by firing at the Israeli jets with anti-aircraft weapons. Lebanese officials have filed over 1600 air space violations by Israel since the 2000 withdrawal.

2010 Israel–Lebanon border clash

On 3 August 2010 Lebanese Armed Forces soldiers opened fire on Israeli army soldiers performing tree-cutting maintenance work on the Israeli side of the Blue Line as confirmed by UNIFIL. One Israeli was killed by Lebanese army fire and three Lebanese died when the Israel Defense Forces (IDF) responded. Lebanese Information Minister Tarek Mitri stated despite the fact that Lebanon accepted earlier the Blue line "The area where the tree was to be cut yesterday […] is south of the Blue Line but is Lebanese territory." UNIFIL determined that the Israeli troops were on Israeli territory.

2011 Israel–Lebanon border clash
On 1 August 2011, UNIFIL confirmed a border incident in which no one was hurt. Israel and Lebanon offered differing accounts of the incident. A Lebanese military official said Israeli troops crossed the Blue Line 30 meters into Lebanese territory, prompting Lebanese soldiers to fire warning shots and the Israeli troops to retreat and fire at Lebanese border posts. The Israeli military sources said their forces were within Israeli territory when they came under fire from across the border.

2013 Hanikra border clash
On 15 December 2013, a Lebanese Army sniper shot dead an Israeli soldier in the Rosh Hanikra border.

2015 Shebaa farms incident
As a response to an Israeli attack against a military convoy comprising Hezbollah and Iranian officers in southern Syria, on 28 January 2015, Hezbollah fired an anti-tank missile at an Israeli military convoy in the Shebaa farms, killing two soldiers and wounding seven. In response, Israel fired at least 50 artillery shells across the border into southern Lebanon, in which a Spanish UN peacekeeper was killed.

2018 cross-border tunnels 
On 4 December 2018, Israel initiated Operation Northern Shield to destroy cross-border tunnels built by Hezbollah along the border. On 17 December 2018, UNIFIL acknowledged the existence of four tunnels near the border, but said "UNIFIL at this stage can confirm that two of the tunnels cross the Blue Line" in violations of United Nations Security Council Resolution 1701, which helped end the 2006 Lebanon War.

2020 Israel–Hezbollah clashes
On 27 July 2020, there was an exchange of fire between Israeli soldiers and four Hezbollah combatants.

2021 rockets launched
In August 2021, a number of rockets and a drone were launched from Southern Lebanon into Israel, which responded with artillery fire. There were no reported casualties but the rockets ignited a bush fire.

See also 
Good Fence
Green Line (Israel)
Green Line (Lebanon)
Purple Line
Shebaa Farms
United Nations Security Council Resolution 1559
United Nations Security Council Resolution 1583
South Lebanon security belt

References

 Lebanon Background, UNIFIL, 2006.
 Ze'ev Schiff, "Thin Blue Line", Ha'aretz, 23 June 2000.

External links
 SECURITY COUNCIL ENDORSES SECRETARY-GENERAL’S CONCLUSION ON ISRAELI WITHDRAWAL FROM LEBANON AS OF 16 JUNE UN Security Council Press Release SC/6878, 16 June 2000

Israel–Lebanon border
Israeli–Lebanese conflict